Frank Van Passel (born 23 June 1964) is a Belgian film director and producer. In 1995, he made his directorial film debut with Manneken Pis, which premiered at the 1995 Cannes Film Festival and won the Mercedes-Benz Award, Grand Golden Rail, Award of the Youth and the Prix Guillermo del Toro . The film received the André Cavens Award for Best Film and four awards at the Joseph Plateau Awards. Van Passel's next film, Villa des Roses (2002), was adapted from the 1913 novella of the same name by Belgian writer Willem Elsschot. The film starred Julie Delpy, Shaun Dingwall and Shirley Henderson. It won Best Feature at the Hollywood Film Festival and was nominated for three awards at the British Independent Film Awards.
His TV-series received numerous awards, including a Special Commendation Prix d'Europe and the FIPA D'OR Grand Prize in Biarritz for The Emperor of Taste and the TV-critics Award and De HA! van Humo for Terug naar Oosterdonk.
He was co-founder of Caviar, a production company with offices in Brussels, Antwerp, Los Angeles, Paris, Amsterdam, London and Prague. Since 2018 he has been working as a freelance director, directing theatre and TV series such as Dag Sinterklaas (Ketnet) and Renaissances (TF1).

Director 

 Renaissances (2021)
 Dag Sinterklaas (2019) (co-direction Stijn Coninx)
 Amateurs (2014)
 Het varken van Madonna (2011)
 De Smaak van De Keyser (2009)
 Villa des Roses (2001)
 Terug naar Oosterdonk (1997)
 Manneken Pis (1995)
 Poes Poes Poes
 Bex & Blanche
 Smeerlappen (1990)
 Ti Amo (1989)
 De Geur van Regen (1988)

Producer 

 Vele Hemels
 Sprakeloos
 Patrouille Linkeroever
 Le Tout Nouveau Testament aka *The Brand New Testament
 Black
 Paradise Trips
 Terug naar morgen
 Tabula Rasa
 Amateurs
 Clan
 My Queen Karo
 Bedankt & Merci
 Bo
 Dennis van Rita 
 Koning van de Wereld
 De Laatste Zomer
 Linkeroever
 Dirty Mind
 De Smaak van De Keyser
 Anneliezen
 Smoorverliefd
 Silent Stories
 Dikke Vrienden

References

External links
 

1964 births
Belgian film directors
Belgian film producers
Living people